In painting, a retarder is a substance, usually a glycol and usually added to water, that is used to slow the drying time of acrylic paints, giving more time for blending or layering highlights.

Use in fine art
Retarders are used to counter the fast drying properties of acrylic paints, making possible the usage of wet-on-wet or other techniques which would otherwise require oil paints. When used correctly, they can keep the paint wet from half an hour extra to a full day's working time. Applying too much retardant, however, can prevent a layer from drying correctly for as long as the retardant is present, causing future damage to the painting unless the affected layer of paint is removed or re-mixed.

Content
They generally contain glycol (such as propylene glycol) or glycerin-based additives.

Home-Made 
For home-made acrylic retarder, water glycerol down about 5:1 (water: glycerol) and apply to paint.

References

Painting materials